Apollo Kids may refer to:
"Apollo Kids" (song), a 1999 song by Ghostface Killah from Supreme Clientele
Apollo Kids (album), a 2010 album by Ghostface Killah